Four Hands Dinner is a 1999 Russian musical drama film directed by Mikhail Kozakov.

Plot 
The film takes place in Leipzig in 1747. Handel invites Bach to dine at the hotel and gradually they begin to understand each other.

Cast 
 Anatoliy Grachyov as Johann Christoph Schmidt (as Anatoli Grachyov)
 Mikhail Kozakov as George Frideric Handel
 Evgeniy Steblov as Johann Sebastian Bach

References

External links 
 

1999 films
1990s Russian-language films
1990s historical drama films
1990s musical drama films
Russian historical drama films
Russian musical drama films
Films set in the 1740s
Films set in Leipzig